Persian LNG is the LNG project in Iran. It has been defined based on the reserves of the South Pars gas field.  The project is developed by the National Iranian Gas Export Company.

Technical description
Persian LNG project consists of development of phases 13 and 14 of South Pars Gas field and construction of two LNG trains each with capacity of 8.1 million tonnes per year. Liquefaction process was to be based on the Shell-Double Mixed Refrigrant Process.

The project is expected to cost US$10 billion and the LNG plant is expected to be commissioned by 2012. The project is in FEED stage.

The LNG plant was to be fed by gas from the South Pars phase 13; however, it was decided to be replaced by other phases.

Project company
Project was originally seen as a partnership of NIOC (50%), Royal Dutch Shell (25%) and Repsol YPF (25%). In 2010, Shell and Repsol were excluded from the project.

See also

World Largest Gas Fields
NIOC Recent Discoveries
Iran Natural Gas Reserves
South Pars Gas Field
North Pars Gas Field
Golshan Gas Field
Ferdowsi Gas Field

References

External links
Persian LNG Company Website

Oil and gas companies of Iran
Proposed liquefied natural gas plants